Edmund Rossingham (sometimes shown as Ensign Rossingham, Captain Rossingham or Roffingham, probably due to old style printing) was the nephew of and factor or agent for Sir George Yeardley, who was Governor of the Colony of Virginia, three times between November 1616 and November 1627, and his wife Temperance Flowerdew. Rossingham was a member of the first assembly of the Virginia House of Burgesses at Jamestown, Virginia in 1619 for Flowerdew Hundred Plantation, Yeardley's plantation.

Rossingham was a son of Temperance Flowerdew's elder sister Mary Flowerdew and her husband Dionysis Rossingham.

Arrival at Jamestown 

Rossingham arrived in Jamestown in April 1619 with the returning Governor Yeardley.

Upon Yeardley's return, he found the colony short of food, as it often was during its early years. Almost immediately, he sent Captain John Martin along with Ensign Harmon Harrison and Ensign Edmund Rossingham to the Chesapeake Bay to trade for corn with the native Indians. Later, Martin was charged, especially by Chief Opchanacanough, that when the Indians refused to sell their corn, Martin took it from them by force. The General Assembly considered the matter but unlike with later controversies concerning Martin, Rossingham, as well as Speaker John Pory and others supported Martin's side.

Burgess 

Along with Mr. Jefferson, John Jefferson (burgess), Ensign Edmund Rossingham represented Yeardley's plantation, Flowerdew Hundred, in the first assembly of the Virginia House of Burgesses in Jamestown, July 30-August 4, 1619 (new style date).

Work for Yeardley 

Rossingham reported that Yeardley gave him a power of attorney and sent him to Newfoundland to trade in January 1620. Rossignham worked for Yeardley as a factor in 1621 and 1623. He also was in England in 1622 to seek debt relief for Yeardley from the Virginia Company of London and the Society of Southampton Hundred. While in England, he testified against Captain John Martin in a Virginia Company hearing concerning Martin's disputes with Yeardley as well as giving information about conditions in Virginia. By this time, Rossingham was identified as Captain.

Compensation dispute with Yeardley estate 

Sir George Yeardley died in Jamestown on November 10, 1627. Rossingham then tried to obtain payment for his services from Yeardley's estate, stating that he was the chief means of raising the value of the estate to 6,000 pounds. Ralph Yeardley, brother of George and administrator of his estate, refused to pay Rossingham. The commissioners for Yeardley's plantation awarded Rossingham 360 pounds on September 25, 1629 but Yeardley still refused to pay. After Rossingham petitioned the Privy Council, on February 19, 1630, the Council ordered Ralph Yeardley to pay Rossingham 200 pounds. Since Yeardley still refused to comply with the order, Rossingham brought suit against him in the Court of Chancery which continued until at least November 1630.

Later Years 

Reliable and verifiable information about Rossingham's later years and death was not found in sources searched for this page's initial posting.

Notes

References
 America and West Indies: July 1629, in Calendar of State Papers Colonial, America and West Indies: Volume 1, 1574-1660, ed. W. Noel Sainsbury (London, 1860), pp. 98-99. British History Online . Retrieved August 10, 2020.
 Flowerdew Hundred web site. . Retrieved August 10, 2020.
 McCartney, Martha W. Virginia immigrants and adventurers, 1607-1635: a biographical dictionary. Baltimore: Genealogical Pub. Co., 2007. .
 "Pedigree of Flowerdew."  The Virginia Magazine of History and Biography, Vol. 25, no. 2, 1917. Virginia Historical Society. p. 208. Retrieved August 10, 2020. via JSTOR.org.
  The Records Of The Virginia Company Of London. The Court Book Volume II. Washington, 1622–1624, Government Printing Office, 1906. At a Court held for Virginia at various dates in 1622 and 1623. Retrieved August 10, 2020 from Virtual Jamestown website.
 Southall, James P. C. "Concerning George Yardley and Temperance Flowerdew", William and Mary Quarterly, July 1947. Retrieved August 10, 2020
 Southall, James P. C.  Captain John Martin of Brandon on the James. "The Virginia Magazine of History and Biography", Vol. 54, No. 1,  January 1946. Published by: Virginia Historical Society. pp. 21-67. Via JSTOR.org. Retrieved August 10, 2020.
 Stanard, William G. and Mary Newton Stanard. The Virginia Colonial Register. Albany, NY: Joel Munsell's Sons Publishers, 1902. , Retrieved July 15, 2011.
 Wolfe, Brendan.   "Sir George Yeardley (bap. 1588–1627)." Encyclopedia Virginia. Virginia Humanities, July 24, 2018. Retrieved August 10, 2020.

Year of birth unknown
Year of death unknown
House of Burgesses members
Virginia colonial people
People from Jamestown, Virginia
People from Prince George County, Virginia